Hypsoropha is a genus of moths of the family Erebidae. The genus was erected by Jacob Hübner in 1818.

Species
 Hypsoropha adeona Druce, 1889 Mexico
 Hypsoropha argyria (Butler, 1879) Brazil (Amazonas)
 Hypsoropha baja McCabe, 1992 Baja, Arizona
 Hypsoropha franclemonti McCabe, 1992 Bahamas
 Hypsoropha hormos Hübner, 1818 New Hampshire, New York - Georgia, Florida - Arizona – small necklace moth
 Hypsoropha monilis (Fabricius, 1777) Florida - North Carolina, Illinois, Missouri – large necklace moth

References

Hypocalinae
Noctuoidea genera